Favria Castle ( is a castle located in Favria, Piedmont, Italy.

History 
The castle dates back to the 12th century. It belonged for a long time to the Marquises of Montferrat, serving in the protection of their domains. In 1446, William VIII, Marquis of Montferrat took steps towards the consolidation of the castle, giving impetus to the development of the settlement of Favria.

The property then belonged to the Solaro di Govone family, who transformed the castle into an elegant residence. The castle remains today a private property.

Description 
Tha castle is located in the center of the town of Favria and is surrounded by a large private garden.

Gallery

References

External links

Favria Castle on Comune di Favria—

Castles in Piedmont